Silent Sanctuary is a 6-piece Filipino rock band that was formed in Metro Manila, Philippines in 2001. Five studio albums have been released by the band throughout its career.

History
Silent Sanctuary was formed in 2001 with three founding members Norman Dellosa (vocals, guitars), Paolo Legaspi (bass guitar, backing vocals), and Allen Calixto (drums). As a growing band, they experimented in their music by mixing in classical instruments to make a unique sound, adding the fourth member, Norman's high school classmate Anjo Inacay (cellist) to the line-up. In 2002, they were asked to guest in UnTV's In the Raw where Anjo asked Jett Ramirez to create string arrangements for their performance. More string instrumentalists joined them during that single episode. Later, Jett Ramirez (violist) and Chino David (violinist) were both asked as formal members of the band. The name Silent Sanctuary was coined by Dellosa. In February 2004, they released an independently produced full-length album in Millennia Bar and Cafe in Kamuning entitled Ellipsis of the Mind. On the same year, Dellosa left the band.

Later on, Sarkie Sarangay took over vocal duties for the band after Norman Dellosa's departure. Jett Ramirez left the band, after they released their debut single  "Rebound"
in 2006.  Jason Rondero, vocalist/bassist of indie band New Modern became the band's new bassist when Paolo Legaspi left the band after their successful label debut album called Fuchsiang Pag-ibig, a year after Sarangay joined the band.

Albums
Silent Sanctuary's second album Fuchsiang Pag-ibig, was released under Universal Records in 2007. They did this with the help of their manager Kerwin Rosete who has worked for Parokya ni Edgar, and is now the person behind One Big Family Artist Management. He also manages other OPM bands including Itchyworms, Ciudad, Soapdish, Overtone, Wandering Dew, and Concrete Sam.  The same year in 2007, Silent Sanctuary also covered their 1st remake single of original APO's classic hit, Tuyo Ng Damdamin for APO Hiking Society's tribute compilation album KaminAPOMuna Ulit.

Their third album called Mistaken for Granted was released on March 27, 2009 under Universal Records with Rommel "Sancho" Sanchez and Buddy Zabala as producers.

Silent Sanctuary spiced up their signature "classical music meets rock music" sound with the release of their 4th album called Monodramatic in 2013. Under Ivory Music & Video Inc., they launched the most awaited album since the last releasing way back 4 years ago.

Silent Sanctuary sang Angel Eyes theme song "Sa'yo" at the #MyxMo2014 concert.

Band members
Current members
 Raymund "Sarkie" Sarangay – vocals, guitars (2004–present); keyboards (2013-2016)
 Anjo Inacay – cello (2001–present); backing vocals (2017 –present)
 Allen Calixto – drums (2001–present)
 Kim Mirandilla-Ng – violin (2017–present)
 Ronnie Ropal – bass guitar (2020–present)
 Poch Villalon – synthesizers, backing vocals (2022–present)

Former members
 Jason Rondero – bass guitar, backing vocals (2008–2021)
Chino David – violin, backing vocals (2001–2017)
Paolo Legaspi  – bass guitar, backing vocals (2001–2008)
Norman Dellosa – vocals, guitars (2001–2004)
Jett Ramirez – viola (2001–2006)

Discography
Ellipsis of the Mind (2004)
Fuchsiang Pag-Ibig (2007)
Mistaken for Granted (2009)
Monodramatic (2013)
Langit Luha (2015)
Kami Na Po Muna Ulit! (Universal Records, 2007)
Kisses Anniversary Album

Awards and nominations

References

Filipino rock music groups
Musical groups from Manila
Universal Records (Philippines) artists
Musical groups established in 2001